is a sub-kilometer asteroid, classified as a near-Earth object and potentially hazardous asteroid of the Apollo group. It was first observed by the LINEAR project on 10 December 2004.

Description 

Although initially there were concerns that it might possibly impact Earth later in the 21st century and thus merit special monitoring, further analysis of its orbit has since ruled out any such collision, at least in the foreseeable future.

Based on optical measurements, the object is between 300 and 800 meters in diameter.

's closest pass by Earth was above the west coast of North America at 04:25 UTC on 3 July 2006.

It was observed immediately after this close approach by radar from three locations, from Goldstone in the Mojave Desert in the US, from Sicily, and from Yevpatoria RT-70 radio telescope, Ukraine, as well as optically from other observatories and amateurs.

It was removed from the Sentry Risk Table on 17 March 2005.

References

External links 
 NASA's Asteroid Radar Group
 Asteroid may pose danger to Earth
 Close pass by space rock
 Sormano Astronomical Observatory: Minor Body Priority List
 Minimum Orbital Intersection Distance
 Closest Approaches to the Earth by Minor Planets
 
 
 

612901
612901
612901
612901
20041210